The year 1607 in music involved some significant events.

Events 
January 6 – Lord Hay's Masque is performed at Whitehall Palace, with music by Thomas Campion and other composers.
February 24 – Première of Claudio Monteverdi's opera L'Orfeo, with libretto by Alessandro Striggio the Younger, at the Ducal Palace of Mantua.
March 1 – Francesco Gonzaga writes that the Duke of Mantua is pleased with Monteverdi's L'Orfeo and that the work had "been to the great satisfaction of all who heard it". Its second performance takes place on this date.
Fourteen-year-old Girolamo Frescobaldi is appointed organist at the church of Santa Maria in Trastevere in Rome, thanks to his patron Guido Bentivoglio.
Francesca Caccini marries Giovanni Battista Signorini.

Publications 
Agostino Agazzari
First book of madrigaletti for three voices (Venice: Ricciardo Amadino)
Second book of madrigaletti for three voices (Venice: Ricciardo Amadino)
Gregor Aichinger
 (Dillingen: Adam Meltzer)
 (Dillingen: Adam Meltzer)
Adriano Banchieri
 for four voices, Op. 16 (Venice: Ricciardo Amadino)
, fifth book for three voices, Op. 14 (Milan: Simon Tini & Filippo Lomazzo), a madrigal comedy
Lodovico Bellanda –  (Music for singing with the theorbo and harpsichord) (Venice: Giacomo Vincenti), a collection of songs for solo voice
Giulio Belli
 for six voices and continuo (Venice: Alessandro Raverii)
 for four voices and continuo (Venice: Alessandro Raverii)
Severo Bonini –  for solo voice with theorbo, harpsichord, or other instrument (Florence: Cristofano Marescotti)
William Byrd – , Book 2, for four, five, and six voices (London: Thomas East for William Barley)
Diomedes Cato
 (Song of Saint Stanislaus) (Kraków: B. Skalski)
 (Kraków: B. Skalski), a collection of sacred music in lute tablature
Giovanni Luca Conforti –  (Venice: Angelo Gardano & fratelli)
Camillo Cortellini – Magnificat for six voices (Venice: Giacomo Vincenti)
Giovanni Croce – Fourth book of madrigals for five and six voices (Venice: Giacomo Vincenti)
Scipione Dentice – Fifth book of madrigals for five voices (Naples: Giovanni Battista Sottile)
Johannes Eccard
  for six voices (Königsberg: Georg Osterberger), a song for the wedding of Johann Stobaeus
 for six voices (Königsberg: Georg Osterberger), a wedding song
 for five voices (Königsberg: Georg Osterberger), a graduation song
Thomas Ford – Musicke of sundrie kindes, set forth in two bookes (London: John Browne)
Melchior Franck –  for five, six, seven, eight, nine, ten, eleven, and twelve voices (Coburg: Justus Hauck)
Marco da Gagliano –  for four voices (Venice: Angelo Gardano & brothers)
Bartholomäus Gesius
 for six voices (Frankfurt an der Oder: Friedrich Hartmann)
 for five voices (Frankfurt an der Oder: Friedrich Hartmann), a funeral motet
Hans Leo Hassler –  for four voices (Nuremberg: Paul Kauffmann)
Tobias Hume – Captaine Humes Poeticall Musicke (London: John Windet), a collection for two bass viols
Johannes Jeep – , vol. 1
Tiburtio Massaino
 for one, two, and three voices, Op. 32 (Venice: Alessandro Raverii), a collection of sacred songs
First book of motets for seven voices with organ bass, Op. 33 (Venice: Alessandro Raverii)
Claudio Monteverdi – , Book 1, for three voices (Venice: Ricciardo Amadino), a collection of madrigals
Pomponio Nenna
Responsories for Christmas and Holy Week for four voices (Naples: Giovanni Battista Sottile)
Sixth book of madrigals for five voices (Naples: Giovanni Battista Sottile)
Asprilio Pacelli – Motets and psalms for eight voices (Frankfurt)
Salustio Palmiero – First book of madrigals for five voices (Venice: Giacomo Vincenti)
Enrico Antonio Radesca – , a collection of motets, psalms, and falsobordoni for two voices and continuo (Milan: Simon Tini & Filippo Lomazzo), also contains one piece by Giovanni Battista Stefanini
Salamone Rossi – a collection of sinfonie and gagliarde

Classical music

Opera 
Feb 24 — Claudio Monteverdi – L'Orfeo, favola in musica, in the Ducal Palace, Mantua

Births 
March 12 – Paul Gerhardt, German hymn-writer (died 1676)
November 1 – Georg Philipp Harsdorffer, librettist (died 1658)
November 6 – Sigmund Theophil Staden, German composer (died 1655)

Deaths 
March 11 – Giovanni Maria Nanino, Italian composer and teacher (born 1543/4)
June 7 – Johannes Matelart, Flemish composer (born c. 1538)
September 10 – Luzzasco Luzzaschi, Ferrarese composer (born c.1545)
September – Claudia Cattaneo, court singer and wife of Claudio Monteverdi

References

 
Music
17th century in music
Music by year